Dennis Challen Brown (also credited as D. C. Brown or simply Dennis Brown) is an American film and television composer.

He is best known for composing the soundtrack to the 1987–1996 Teenage Mutant Ninja Turtles animated TV series, along with Chuck Lorre—with whom he has continued to work ever since.

He is a six-time BMI TV Music Award winner, for Grace Under Fire and Dharma & Greg, respectively.

Filmography
Mike & Molly - 2010–2016 TV series
Ark - 2005 animated film
Room to Grow - 2005 animated TV special 
Two and a Half Men - 2003–present TV series
Still Standing - 2002–2006 TV series
Little Shepherd - 2002 direct-to-video animated film
Dharma & Greg - 1997–2002 TV series (Three-time BMI TV Music Award winner)
The Golden Goose - 1997 Happily Ever After: Fairy Tales for Every Child animated TV episode
Budgie the Little Helicopter - 1994–1996 animated TV series
Dino Babies - 1994–1995 animated TV series
Snow White and the Magic Mirror - 1994 direct-to-video animated film
Grace Under Fire - 1993–1996 TV series (Three-time BMI TV Music Award winner)
Speed Racer - 1993–1994 animated TV series
What's Up, Mom? - 1992 Chucklewood Critters animated TV special
Honeybunch - 1992 Chucklewood Critters animated TV special
James Bond Jr. - 1991–1992 animated TV series
Toxic Crusaders - 1991 animated TV series
Barnyard Commandos - 1990 animated TV series
The California Raisin Show - 1989 animated TV series
Teenage Mutant Ninja Turtles - 1987–1996 animated TV series
Little Clowns of Happytown (original songs and themes composer) - 1987–1988 animated TV series

External links

Dennis C. Brown at the SCL Community Member Directory
Dennis C. Brown at SESAC

American film score composers
American male film score composers
American television composers
Living people
Year of birth missing (living people)
Place of birth missing (living people)